Methodist-Episcopal Church of Norwich is a historic Methodist Episcopal church located at 74 N. Broad Street in Norwich, Chenango County, New York.  It was designed by architect Isaac G. Perry and built 1873–1875.  It is a large, two story brick structure, generally rectangular in shape (110 feet long by 64 feet wide) with a cross gabled transept (76 feet wide by 12 feet deep).  The front facade features two engaged towers with a large, central round arched entrance.  The north tower is surmounted by a 115-foot octagonal spire.  The south tower includes a belfry and 190  foot spire.

It was added to the National Register of Historic Places in 2003.

References

Methodist churches in New York (state)
Churches on the National Register of Historic Places in New York (state)
Churches completed in 1873
19th-century Methodist church buildings in the United States
Churches in Chenango County, New York
National Register of Historic Places in Chenango County, New York